The following is a comprehensive discography of Poison, an American glam metal band that achieved huge success in the mid-1980s to mid-1990s. Poison sold more than 16 million records in the United States alone. The band has also charted ten singles to the Top 40 of the Billboard Hot 100, including six Top 10 singles and the Hot 100 number-one single, "Every Rose Has Its Thorn". The band became icons of the 1980s MTV era and have had widespread commercial success. The band's breakthrough debut album, the multi-platinum Look What the Cat Dragged In was released in 1986 and they hit their peak with the second album, the multi-platinum selling Open Up and Say... Ahh! which became the band's most successful album ever. The popularity  continued into the new decade with their third consecutive multi-platinum selling album Flesh & Blood.

In the 1990s following the release of the band's first live album Swallow This Live, the band experienced some line up changes and the fall of glam metal with the grunge movement, but despite the drop in popularity the band's fourth studio album Native Tongue still achieved Gold status and the band's first compilation album Poison's Greatest Hits: 1986–1996 went double platinum.

In the 2000s, with the original line up back together, the band found new popularity after a successful greatest hits reunion tour in 1999. The band began the new decade with the release of the long-awaited Crack a Smile... and More!, followed by the Power to the People album. The band toured almost every year to sold out stadiums and arenas. They released a brand new album Hollyweird in 2002 and in 2006 the band celebrated their 20-year anniversary with The Best of Poison: 20 Years of Rock tour and album, which was certified gold and marked Poison's return to the Billboard 200 top 20 charts for the first time since 1993. After over 35 years, the band is still recording music and performing.

Since their debut in 1986, they have released seven studio albums, four live albums, five compilation albums, and have issued 28 singles to radio.

Albums

Studio albums

Live albums

Compilation albums

Box sets

Singles

Videography

Video albums

Music videos

References

Heavy metal discographies
 
 
Discographies of American artists
Rock music group discographies